Diplomatic relations between Armenia and Turkey are officially non-existent and have historically been hostile. Whilst Turkey recognised Armenia (in the borders of the Armenian Soviet Socialist Republic) shortly after the latter proclaimed independence in September 1991, the two countries have failed to establish diplomatic relations. In 1993, Turkey reacted to the war in Nagorno-Karabakh by closing its border with Armenia out of support for Azerbaijan.

In 2008–2009, the countries experienced a brief thaw in bilateral relations and in October 2009 the sides signed the normalization protocols.  However, the protocols were never ratified, and in the following year, the rapprochement came to a close; the protocols were formally annulled by Armenia in March 2018.

In December 2021, Armenia and Turkey announced appointing special envoys who met in Moscow in January 2022, with positive international reactions for attempts of normalising relations. On 1 January 2022, Armenia lifted the embargo on Turkey.

Turkic migration to Anatolia from Central Asia and the rise of empire 

In 1071, the Seljuk Turks defeated the Byzantine Empire and captured its emperor at the Battle of Manzikert. In the resulting chaos, the Turks easily overran much of the Byzantine Anatolia. Despite Byzantine reconquests and occasional western incursions in the form of crusading armies, a series of Turkish states were established in Anatolia. These Turkic tribes came around the south end of the Caspian Sea for the most part, and hence absorbed and transmitted Islamic culture and civilization in contrast to other Turks who, such as the Cumans, became partially Westernized and Christianized. With some superiority in population and organization, regional power naturally came to rest in the hands of the Turkic speaking population. Many Turkic people came into the region fleeing from the Mongol invasions, and others later came in as soldiers fighting in the ranks of Mongol armies.  Turkic Islamized populations also absorbed large numbers of the older inhabitants of Asia Minor, including Greeks and Armenians, who went over to the Islamic religion and Turkic language, creating a frontier society. Armenian communities continued to flourish under relatively tolerant Ottoman rule for centuries, either as minority populations in urban areas or as exclusively Armenian towns in rural areas. In cities such as Istanbul and İzmir, Armenians played particularly important roles; an 1851 report in The New York Times, for instance, indicates that Armenians comprised nearly one quarter of the population of Istanbul at that time, with over 200,000 residents.

Armenian–Turkish relations during the decline of the Ottoman Empire

Hamidian rule 
For a half century leading up to World War I, the Armenian populations of Anatolia became increasingly politically active, and in turn endured increasingly more brutal persecution under Sultan Abdul Hamid II. As the Ottoman Empire declined, its political leadership either authorized or tolerated increasingly violent and reckless attacks on the Armenian population, attracting harsh criticism from various Western nations whose missionary communities in Anatolia witnessed several wide scale massacres of Armenians. From 1894 to 1896 the Sultan ordered the deaths of up to 300,000 Armenians, resulting in at least 50,000 Armenian orphans, in the Hamidian massacres, which were later described by BBC correspondent Chris Morris in The New Turkey (Granta Books, 2005) as "a portent of the grim events of 1915".

The ensuing violence prompted condemnation from several heads of state, including American President Grover Cleveland, who condemned the "bloody butchery" in Anatolia. While it was unclear to what extent the violence against Armenians was governmentally organized, Cleveland's speech noted that "strong evidence exists of actual complicity of Turkish soldiers in the work of destruction and robbery."

In 1909, as the authority of the nascent Young Turk government splintered, Abdul Hamid II briefly regained his sultanate with a populist appeal to Islamism. 30,000 Armenians perished in the subsequent Adana Massacre.

The Armenian national movement 

The Armenian national movement, also known as the "Armenian revolutionary movement", was the Armenian national effort to re-establish an Armenian state in the historic Armenian homelands of eastern Asia Minor and the Transcaucasus (Southern Caucasus). The decline of the Ottoman Empire was in part the result and in part the cause of the rise of nationalism among various groups that made up the multi-ethnic and multi-religion empire. The 1877–1878 Russo-Turkish War, which resulted in the independence of Romania, Serbia and Montenegro, provided a model for other aspiring nationalists and revolutionaries. The Hinchak and Dashnak, Armenian revolutionary committees, were formed following the 1878 Berlin Treaty in the eastern provinces of the Ottoman Empire, which were very much under direct Russian threat. Yet, this is contrasted by Fâ'iz el-Ghusein, who stated, "I have enquired of many Armenians whom I have met, but I have not found one who said that he desired political independence."

Zaven, the Armenian bishop in Istanbul had already declared, before the war started, to the reporter of Msak, the organ of the Armenian nationalist-liberals, that "the radical solution of the Armenian Question would be the unification of all Armenia (including the Eastern Anatolia of Turkey-M.P.) under Russian sovereignty with which Armenians' fate was historically linked. The bishop stated that "the sooner the Russians arrive here, the better for us."

Agitation for improvement of living conditions in the Ottoman Empire among Armenians had started much before the events of World War I, as reported in The New York Times of July 29, 1894:

In 1894, Zeki Pasha, Commandant of the Fourth Army Corps, was decorated for his participation during the Sassoun massacre. During the massacres, he reportedly stated, "not finding any rebellion we cleared the country so none should occur in the future."

The Armenian genocide 

The Armenian genocide was the forced deportation and extermination of the majority of the Ottoman Armenian population between 1915 and 1917, when between 800,000 to 1,500,000 (per the government of France) Armenians were killed.

According to Rafael de Nogales, Ottoman commander of the artillery at Van Resistance, "the Armenians’ posture was defensive and in response to the massacres being committed in villages surrounding Van". Also, Armenians were being forcibly relocated from Zeitun in March 1915, months before the Tehcir Law was passed. Further massacres and deportations occurred during the closing stages and immediate aftermath of World War I. The modern Turkish government has always denied the fact that the massacres of the Armenians during the Ottoman period constituted genocide, inflaming Armenian resentment in Armenia and around the world.
In recent years the Armenian genocide of 1915 has been increasingly discussed in Turkey, at conferences and universities, since the law does not prevent debates on the topic. Even though freedom of speech and freedom of thought are guaranteed by Turkish law due to the nature of Article 301, people claiming an Armenian genocide can be accused of calling the nation "killers" and thus "insulting Turkishness". Over eighty authors have faced prosecution for "insulting Turkishness"; Kemal Kerinçsiz, an ultra-nationalist lawyer, is responsible for at least forty of them, and his group Büyük Hukukçular Birliği ("Great Union of Jurists" or "Turkish Lawyer's Union") for most of the rest. The Turkish educational system continues to mandate teaching of Armenian genocide denial in its public schools.

First Republic of Armenia

The interwar period, and the Soviet era

Capital tax and Aşkale 

During World War II, an extremely high tax burden was imposed on Armenian, Greek and Jewish citizens of Turkey, and tax assessors had a free hand in determining the amount, often amounts that could not be paid. In the winter of 1942, hundreds who could not pay, including elderly men, were brought to the town of Aşkale, with very harsh winters, and made to shovel snow continually for as much as five months. Some were able to pay locals to perform the labor for them, and some succumbed to the cold and conditions, sleeping in barns, coffeehouses, or anywhere else they could get shelter. The book "You Rejoice My Heart" by Turkish author Kemal Yalçın includes a visit by the author to Aşkale in the 1990s to learn first hand about the tax and the labor camps, the conditions and the victims at a time when this incident was dangerous and taboo to discuss in Turkey.

Istanbul Pogrom 
The Istanbul Pogrom was launched in Turkey against ethnic minorities residing in Istanbul, in particular Greeks and Armenians during the year September 1955.

Paramilitary activity 

ASALA, the Armenian Secret Army for the Liberation of Armenia, was a Marxist–Leninist organization of Lebanese extraction, that operated from 1975 to 1991. In the 1980s it launched a series of assassinations against Turkish diplomats in several countries, with the stated intention to compel the Turkish Government to acknowledge its responsibility for the Armenian genocide, pay reparations, and cede territory. The territorial claim related to the 1920 Treaty of Sèvres and a Woodrow Wilson-era plan for an Armenian homeland.

The group planned attacks worldwide, though it experienced internal splintering after its 1983 Orly Airport attack incurred non-Turkish casualties. The attacks, which were routinely condemned by Armenian church leaders, as well as the international community, were famously protested by an Armenian named Artin Penik in 1982, who self-immolated in Istanbul's Taksim Square to demonstrate the force of his opposition to ASALA tactics. The Armenian Patriarch of Constantinople, who visited the badly burned Penik in the hospital shortly before his death, described him as "a symbol of Armenian discontent with these brutal murders."

A similar organization, Justice Commandos Against Armenian Genocide, at times known as the Armenian Revolutionary Army, was responsible for at least an additional six killings. In the 1983 Turkish embassy attack in Lisbon, gunmen deliberately "sacrificed" themselves by setting off a bomb in the building, such that none of them survived.

Amidst a spate of attacks in 1985, U.S. President Ronald Reagan asked Congress to defeat a resolution recognizing the "genocidal massacre" of Armenians, in part for his fear that it might indirectly "reward terrorism". According to the MIPT website, there had been 84 incidents involving ASALA leaving 46 people dead, and 299 people injured.

Modern relations

Armenian independence 1991
 

Turkey was one of the first countries to recognize Armenia's independence after the collapse of the Soviet Union in 1991.  Ankara, however, refused to establish diplomatic relations with Yerevan, as well as to launch the two Turkish-Armenian border gates, such as Alijan – Margaran and Dogukap – Akhurik. Turkey put forward two preconditions: Armenia must recognize the Turkish-Armenian border, which was established under the Treaty of Kars in 1921, that is, waive territorial claims, as well as put an end to the process of international recognition of the Armenian genocide.

Diplomatic freeze

Nagorno-Karabakh War

United Nations Security Council Resolution 822
Turkey cosponsored UN Security Council Resolution 822 affirming Nagorno-Karabakh as part of Azerbaijan's territorial integrity and demanding that Armenian forces withdraw from Kelbajar. Later in 1993 Turkey joined Azerbaijan in imposing an economic embargo on Armenia and the border between the two states was closed.

In mid-August, 1993, Armenians massed a force to take the Azeri regions of Fizuli and Jebrail, south of Nagorno-Karabakh proper and Turkish Prime Minister Tansu Çiller responded by sending thousands of Turkish troops to the border and demanding that Armenia pull out of Azerbaijan's territories. Russian Federation forces in Armenia however countered their movements and thus warded off any possibility that Turkey might play a military role in the conflict.

Memories of the Armenian genocide were re-awoken during the conflict by claims of ethnic cleansing.

Ongoing blockade
Turkey does not recognize the Nagorno-Karabakh Republic (Republic of Artsakh) that emerged from the May 16, 1994, Russian mediated cease-fire to the First Nagorno-Karabakh War, and has set Armenian withdrawal from the disputed oblast and seven surrounding districts as a precondition for establishing diplomatic relations and reopening their joint border.

Armenia claims that Turkey has used the ongoing blockade that resulted from the unresolved Nagorno-Karabakh conflict to isolate the country with projects such as the Baku-Tbilisi-Ceyhan oil pipeline, Baku-Tbilisi-Erzurum natural gas pipeline and the Kars-Tbilisi-Baku railway, all of which directly bypass Armenia despite the economic logic of incorporating Armenia. A rail line from Kars to Baku already existed in fact, but had been closed by Turkey, as it passes through the  closed Turkey–Armenia border.

Armenia, which has no coal, natural gas or oil of its own and scant wind and water resources, had long been suffering from severe energy shortages and now blockaded by neighbouring Turkey and Azerbaijan, from whom it used to import nearly all its fuel, was forced to announce that it would restart the second of two VVER reactors in the Metsamor Nuclear Power Plant. Armenian Environmental Committee Chairman Samuel Shahinian explained the decision; "Our people are so cold we cannot explain anything to them, they just want to be warm." The reactors, which had been commissioned by the Soviet authorities in 1979 and had long been considered dangerously out-of-date, were shut down in 1988 over safety concerns following the nearby Spitak earthquake. The announcement prompted uproar in Turkey whose border is just 17 km from Metsamor. "There are certain risks", confirmed Armenian Deputy Speaker Ara Sahakian, "but we should realise and everyone should realise we have no other choice."

Metsamor re-commissioning

Metsamor unit-2 was recommissioned in 1995 after an estimated $50m had been spent on safety improvements but this did little to alleviate safety concerns in Turkey and the Turkish Atomic Energy Agency (TAEK) along with the Turkish Environment and Forestry Ministry, Kafkas University and various institutes and foundations formed a tight infrastructure of control in the region across the border from the reactor and set up the RESAI early warning system to take constant measurements of airborne gamma radiation levels and sample analyses of local soil, plant, and food to give advance warning when levels rise above threshold limits. TAEK Deputy Chairman Dr. Erdener Birol confirms, "As the radiation level increases, Ankara is notified about it immediately."

Further safety concerns arose when it was revealed that the ongoing blockade of the country by its neighbours Turkey and Azerbaijan meant that nuclear fuel for the plant was flown onboard Antonov and Tupolev airplanes from Russia into Yerevan Airport in secret shipments which Alexis Louber, Head of the EU delegation in Yerevan, likened to "flying around a potential nuclear bomb."

Elie Wiesel affirmation of the Armenian genocide
On June 9, 2000, in a full-page statement in The New York Times, 126 scholars, including Nobel Prize-winner Elie Wiesel, historian Yehuda Bauer, and sociologist Irving Horowitz, signed a document "affirming that the World War I Armenian genocide is an incontestable historical fact and accordingly urge the governments of Western democracies to likewise recognize it as such." According to Stephen Kinzer the reshaping of the national consciousness in the first years of the new century "allowed [the Turks] to open their minds to alternative views of the 1915 tragedy," and, "more than a dozen books touching on this subject were published in Turkey, bearing titles like Armenians in Our Neighbourhood and The Armenian Taboo."

ALTAY operation 
According to the news website Nordic Monitor, Turkey planned  military action against Armenia code-named ALTAY. The operation plan was finalized in 2001.  Details leaked in 2019, when it was also mentioned that the plan is still valid.

Metsamor deadline

Shortly after Armenia became a member of the Council of Europe in 2001 authorities in Yerevan stated that they expected EU assistance in the construction of a gas pipeline linking Armenia to neighbouring Iran and in the lifting of Turkish and Azerbaijani blockade. Armenian Deputy Energy Minister Areg Galstyan indicated that the plant, which provides 40 per cent of Armenia's energy and sells excess power to neighbouring Georgia, should remain running until 2016 and possibly 2031 as, "It was a big mistake to shut the plant in 1988; it created an energy crisis and the people and the economy suffered. It is impossible for the government to cause the same problem again by closing the plant."

Professor Hayrettin Kilic of Ferrara University speaking at a conference jointly organised by the Kars City Council and Kafkas University responded that, "The risk is tremendous. Metsamor nuclear power plant is not a problem of Kars, Ağrı, Iğdır, Yerevan and Nakhichevan but a problem of Turkey, Georgia and all Armenia. This is a regional problem." Igdir Mayor Nurettin Aras stated, "We are in danger of a disaster. We will apply for the closing down of the nuclear plant," and Kars Mayor Naif Alibeyoglu confirmed that, "We are doing everything to close this plant, but not everything is in our power. It is essential that state authorities attend to this matter closely," and, "The Turkish government should start an initiative for the closure of the plant. Both Turkish and Armenian people should be aware of  danger."

Galstyan dismissed safety concerns stating that it is more important to Armenians "to keep the electricity on," whilst Jeremy Page, writing in The Times pointed out that, "The mostly Christian nation is also reluctant to rely on imported energy because of its history of hostility with its Islamic neighbours."

Turkish-Armenian Reconciliation Commission
The Turkish-Armenian Reconciliation Commission was launched on 9 July 2001 in Geneva, Switzerland with ten individuals from Armenia, Turkey, Russia, and the United States mostly consisting of former high-ranking politicians renowned for their past achievements who aimed "to promote mutual understanding and goodwill between Turks and Armenians and to encourage improved relations." Armenian Assembly of America (AAA) Chairman Harair Hovnanian stated, "This is the first multi-disciplinary, comprehensive attempt to reconcile differences between two neighbors, separated by bitterness and mistrust, and as such, it is a major advance", and AAA President Carolyn Mugar added, "We believe that the Turkish-Armenian Reconciliation Commission will benefit and build on the experiences of other similar international efforts."

AKP comes to power in Turkey

Restrictions on Armenians entering Turkey had been lifted in January 2002, and although the border between the two countries remained closed, Armenian workers were reportedly entering the country via Georgia and remaining illegally after their 30-day non-resident visa expired. An undeclared official Turkish policy developed to keep the illegal immigrants relatively comfortable with Turkish Prime Minister Erdoğan later announcing, "they could not sustain themselves in their homeland, and we opened our doors. We could deport them but we are not doing so." Gazi University professor Mehmet Seyfettin Erol confirmed that, "This is soft power for Turkey," of the policy credited with improving bilateral relations, "Treating them as ‘others’ does not serve any purpose and it will in all likelihood push Armenians away from Turkey."

The International Center for Transitional Justice was asked by the Turkish-Armenian Reconciliation Commission to provide a report on the applicability of the Genocide Convention to the controversy. This report ruled that the term "genocide" aptly describes "the Ottoman massacre of Armenians in 1915–1918", but added that the modern Republic of Turkey was not legally liable for the event.

The issue of Turkey's accession to EU 

Some European Union politicians pressured Turkey into formally recognizing the Armenian genocide as a precondition for joining the EU. This was widely criticized within Turkey.

Among the fiercest critics of this method of pressuring Turkey was the late Hrant Dink, who accused Angela Merkel of sponsoring legislation acknowledging the Armenian genocide to undermine Turkey's EU ambitions. Dink suggested that anyone sincerely interested in the welfare of the Armenian and Turkish peoples would sooner pressure Yerevan to finally replace the Metsamor reactor, or press Turkey to finally open the Armenian–Turkish border, or even just generally "help economically and diplomatically and support the moderates who exist on both sides."

According to former Armenian President Robert Kocharyan, "Armenia has never been against Turkey's accession to the European Union." Armenia itself is a member of the EU's New Neighborhood group, which may one day lead to EU membership.

Former Armenian Foreign Minister Vardan Oskanyan, while conceding that "genocide denial hurts", insists that the Turkish viewpoint does not necessarily "impede the normalization of our relations".

Proposed joint historical commission on events of 1915
In 2005 a group of Turkish scholars and opinion makers held an academic conference at which, it was vowed, all points of view about the Armenian massacre would be respectfully heard. According to Stephen Kinzer, "Some commentators objected to parts of what was said at the conference, but nearly all welcomed the breakthrough to open debate on this painful subject." The International Association of Genocide Scholars, referred to as amateurs by Guenter Lewy, affirmed that scholarly evidence revealed the "Young Turk government of the Ottoman Empire began a systematic genocide of its Armenian citizens – an unarmed Christian minority population. More than a million Armenians were exterminated through direct killing, starvation, torture, and forced death marches" and condemned Turkish attempts to deny its factual and moral reality.

The idea of the establishment of a joint commission composed of historians from Turkey and Armenia, which would examine both countries′ national archives, including "the archives of related countries" and disclose the findings of their research to the international public was approved by the Turkish Grand National Assembly  and a letter  was sent from the then prime minister Recep Tayyip Erdogan to the Armenian president.

However, the Armenian president's letter as of April 2005 to prime minister Recep Tayyip Erdoğan rejected  the offer for the joint commission saying,

In 2006, after years of campaigning by French citizens of Armenian descent, the French National Assembly, in what Stephen Kinzer calls "an astonishing victory" officially declared that Ottoman Turks committed genocide in 1915, and voted it a crime for anyone to assert otherwise.

In February 2007, Armenia's president Robert Kocharian while on a visit to France said that the "normalization of bilateral relations is the responsibility of governments, not historians."

In April 2015, Armenia's president Serzh Sargsyan said "It becomes obvious that the Turkish proposal of establishing the so-called commission of historians has only one goal, which is to delay the process of the Armenian genocide recognition, and divert the attention of international community from that crime. That is not only our view but also the view of the international community that goes on recognizing and condemning the Armenian Genocide."

Post-2007 diplomatic thaw

Hrant Dink assassination

Shortly after the arrest of Ogün Samast, the 17-year-old nationalist suspected in the murder, pictures surfaced of the assassin flanked by smiling Turkish police and gendarmerie, who were posing with the killer in front of the Turkish flag while he was in police custody. The pictures triggered a spate of investigations and the removal from office of those involved.

At Hrant Dink's funeral, tens of thousands of Turkish citizens marched in solidarity with Dink, many bearing placards reading "We are all Hrant Dink, we are all Armenians" sounding a hopeful note in the development of Armenian–Turkish relations.

Nobel Laureate genocide re-affirmation
In 2007, the Elie Wiesel Foundation for Humanity produced a letter signed by 53 Nobel Laureates re-affirming the Genocide Scholars' conclusion that the 1915 killings of Armenians constituted genocide. Then Turkish Foreign Minister, Abdullah Gül, responded by reaffirming calls for a committee of Turkish and Armenian historians to re-examine the events of 1915, as first suggested in 2005, but Armenians showed no interest in the suggestion with a 2007 public opinion survey quoted by Stephen Kinzer indicating that, "only 3 percent of Armenians believe that forcing Turkey to admit genocide should be their government's top priority," and, "Only 4 percent even placed it on their list of priorities."

Efforts by Americans of Armenian descent to have the US Congress pass a resolution recognising the Armenian Genocide, however, continued through what Stephen Kinzer calls "their superbly effective lobby in Washington" and "almost passed the House of Representatives in 2007, thanks to the influence of Speaker of the House Nancy Pelosi, in whose home state of California many prosperous Armenian-Americans live," until Condoleezza Rice and Robert M. Gates signed an open letter to Congress, warning that formally recognizing the Armenian genocide "could harm American troops in the field" by "antagonizing" Turkey.

Metsamor replacement
On September 7, 2007, Armenian Energy Minister Armen Movsisyan announced that Metsamor unit-2 was to be replaced with a new nuclear power plant built on the same site at a cost of $2 billion. "The project's feasibility study is being carried out by Armenia, Russia, the US and the International Atomic Energy Agency. The old nuclear power plant is to be rebuilt within four-and-a-half years", he stated, clarifying that "many foreign countries now understand that Armenia must have a nuclear power plant." TAEK, which had recently denied claims in Today's Zaman that its latest protest to the IAEA was made in response to the RESAI early warning system indicating "an increase in radioactive leakage in the region," stating, "None of the radioactivity analyses or RESAI station measurements done up until now have uncovered radioactivity or radiation levels above normal," confirmed that it would be involved in following related developments and taking the necessary precautions from the Turkish side.

2008 Armenian Genocide Remembrance Day
On April 24, 2008, during Armenia's annual Genocide Remembrance Day, a Turkish flag was stomped on during an official demonstration in Yerevan. The Turkish Foreign Ministry reacted by issuing the statement: "With the meaning that it carries, the Turkish flag symbolizes freedom and all the fundamental values and beliefs of the Turkish nation. The flag is accepted as synonymous with our nation's existence. The importance attributed by the Turkish nation to these values and its flag is widely known. In this regard, the related news reports led to great sadness, upset and indignation in our society."

2008–2009 Georgia–Russia crisis
Following the 2008 South Ossetia war, which prompted concerns over stability of energy routes in the Caucasus, normalisation of ties with Armenia became a priority for the Turkish government.

Attempted rapprochement

Turkish Presidential visit to Armenia and subsequent negotiations
In September 2008, Turkish President Abdullah Gül became the first Turkish head of state to visit Armenia after he accepted the invitation of Armenian President Serzh Sargsyan to attend a FIFA World Cup qualifier football match between the Turkish and Armenian national football teams. Talks during the game focused on bilateral relations and Karabakh, and did not touch upon the Armenian Genocide, though Foreign Minister Ali Babacan raised the issue soon afterward. Both of the presidents and their countries’ respective press reflected positively on the visit setting the ground for a thaw in diplomatic relations that was expected to have made great progress in time for Sargsyan's reciprocal visit to Turkey in October to watch the return match.

On the eve of the 2009 US presidential visit to Turkey by Barack Obama sources in Ankara and Yerevan announced that a deal might soon be struck to reopen the border between the two states and exchange diplomatic personnel. A research conducted on the Armenia-Turkey border reopening has shown that closed borders between Armenia and its neighboring countries have a negative impact on the Armenian economy. It is not argued that a re-opening of the borders (especially with Turkey) will bring many benefits to the Armenian economy.

Armenian Foreign Minister Eduard Nalbandyan confirmed, "Turkey and Armenia have gone a long way toward opening the Turkey-Armenia border, and they will come closer to opening it soon," but dismissed any connection to the Nagorno-Karabakh dispute.
The International Crisis Group (ICG) issued a report on the normalisation stating, "The politicized debate whether to recognize as genocide the destruction of much of the Ottoman Armenian population and the stalemated Armenia-Azerbaijan conflict over Nagorno-Karabakh should not halt momentum." Stating that whilst, "The unresolved Armenia-Azerbaijan conflict over Nagorno-Karabakh still risks undermining full adoption and implementation of the potential package deal between Turkey and Armenia", the, "Bilateral détente with Armenia ultimately could help Baku recover territory better than the current stalemate."

Announcement of provisional roadmap and reactions
On 22 April 2009, it was announced that high-level diplomatic talks underway in Switzerland since 2007 "had achieved tangible progress and mutual understanding," and that "a road map has been identified," for normalizing diplomatic relations between the two countries, although no formal text had yet been signed. Today's Zaman concluded that the cautious approach by Turkish authorities was intended to minimise criticism from Azerbaijan and nationalist Turks who would complain of "submission to Western pressure" but went on to quote an unnamed Western diplomat who speaking to Reuters confirmed that, "All the documents have been agreed in principle," and that, "We are talking about weeks or months."

The Armenian Dashnak Party responded to the announcement in an April 26 closed-door meeting with a decision to withdraw its 16 deputies, who held three ministries in the Armenian Cabinet, from the coalition government.
Reaction to the announcement within Turkey was more muted with opposition MHP leader Bahçeli complaining that, "Armenia knows what is going on; Switzerland knows what is going on; Turkish officials involved in the process know. That means the Turkish nation and Parliament are the only ones who have no information about the process," before going on to conclude that, "It would be beneficial if the prime minister or the minister for foreign affairs would inform Parliament. We will follow developments, but for the moment we don't know the depth of the agreement. Taking the explanations made so far into account, we are monitoring whether any further steps are being taken in the issue of opening the border."

United States statements on Armenian Remembrance Day
The 2009 statement by U.S. President Barack Obama on Armenian Remembrance Day claimed that, "reckoning with the past holds out a powerful promise of reconciliation," before going on to state that, "the best way to advance that goal right now is for the Armenian and Turkish people to address the facts of the past as part of their effort to move forward," and reaffirming his strong support for "efforts by the Turkish and Armenian people to work through this painful history in a way that is honest open and constructive," but although, as previously indicated, U.S. President Obama did not use the word ‘genocide’ his use of the Armenian term Meds Yeghern, translated as "Great Crime" or "Calamity", managed to offend both sides of the dispute. 

Turkish prime minister Recep Tayyip Erdoğan said, "Turkey is not a country that can be flattered and then fooled," before going on to conclude that, "Turkish-Armenian relations will be normalised, historical matters will be enlightened and the road will be paved for peace if countries that have nothing to do with the issue stop getting involved." Turkish opposition leaders were equally critical with MHP leader Bahçeli stating, "Looking at the entire statement, one will see that it is unacceptable," and, "If the U.S. sacrifices Turkey for the sake of Armenian votes, everyone, including most notably Armenia, will have to suffer the consequences," and CHP leader Baykal clarifying that, "Obama's statement shows that efforts to please outsiders by giving concessions are not yielding any result, and we have managed to alienate Azerbaijan, too."

2009 Turkish Presidential visit to Azerbaijan and Russia
Armenian authorities responded to comments made by Turkish Prime Minister Erdoğan during his official visit to Baku that, "There is a relation of cause and effect here. The occupation of Nagorno-Karabakh is the cause, and the closure of the border is the effect. Without the occupation ending, the gates will not be opened," with a statement from the office of Armenian President Sarksyan that read, "The president said that, as he repeatedly pointed out during Armenian-Turkish contacts, any Turkish attempt to interfere in the settlement of the Nagorno-Karabakh problem can only harm that process." Armenian Foreign Minister Nalbandian reiterated that, "Concerning the Armenian-Turkish normalisation process, over the past year, following the initiative of the Armenian President together with our Turkish neighbours and with the help of our Swiss partners, we have advanced toward opening one of the last closed borders in Europe and the normalisation of our relations without preconditions. The ball is on the Turkish side now. And we hope that they will find the wisdom and the courage to make the last decisive step. We wish to be confident that the necessary political will can eventually leave behind the mentality of the past."

Erdoğan flew on from Baku to Sochi, Russia, for a 16 May "working visit" with Russian Prime Minister Vladimir Putin at which he stated, "Turkey and Russia have responsibilities in the region. We have to take steps for the peace and well-being of the region. This includes the Nagorno-Karabakh problem, the Middle East dispute, the Cyprus problem." Putin responded that, "Russia and Turkey seek for such problems to be resolved and will facilitate this in every way," but, "As for difficult problems from the past–and the Karabakh problem is among such issues-a compromise should be found by the participants in the conflict. Other states which help reach a compromise in this aspect can play a role of mediators and guarantors to implement the signed agreements."

2009 signing of accord

An accord between Armenia and Turkey was signed by the foreign ministers of the two countries, Ahmet Davutoğlu and Eduard Nalbandyan, on 10 October 2009. The signing took place in Zürich, Switzerland. Armenians worldwide had protested against the deal because of the controversial concessions that the Armenian leadership was preparing to make, most notably in regards to the Armenian genocide and the Turkish-Armenian border. The deal followed more than one year of talks. It was designed to allow the opening of borders and to set up a formal diplomatic relationship. The signing was attended by Bernard Kouchner, Sergey Lavrov and Hillary Clinton, the foreign ministers of France, Russia and the United States, respectively.

Suspension of the ratification process
Those diplomatic efforts to normalise the relations initiated by Armenia eventually faltered.

In Armenia, before sending the protocols to the parliament, it was sent to the Constitutional Court to have their constitutionality to be approved. The Constitutional Court made references to the preamble of the protocols underlying three main issues. One of them stated that the implementation of the protocols did not imply Armenia's official recognition of the existing Turkish-Armenian border established by the Treaty of Kars. By doing so, the Constitutional Court rejected one of the main premises of the protocols, i.e. “the mutual recognition of the existing border between the two countries as defined by relevant treaties of international law". This was regarded by the Turkish Government as effectively revising the protocols and thus the reason to back down from the process.

The ruling Armenian coalition decided to propose a suspension of the ratification process to the president after the Turkish Prime Minister Erdogan announced multiple times that the Turkish ratification depended on a peace deal in Nagorno-Karabakh conflict. On the same day President Sargsyan suspended the ratification process although announcing, that Armenia does not suspend the process of normalisation of relationships with Turkey as a whole.

Events after the failed thaw

Possible territorial claims by Armenia
On July 5, 2013, during a forum of Armenian lawyers in Yerevan on the 100th Anniversary of the Armenian genocide organized by the Ministry of Diaspora, Armenia's Prosecutor General Aghvan Hovsepyan made a "sensational statement". Hovsepyan stated:

According to ArmeniaNow news agency "this was seen as the first territorial claim of Armenia to Turkey made on an official level. The prosecutor general is the carrier of the highest legal authority in the country, and his statement is equivalent to an official statement."

In response, the Turkish Ministry of Foreign Affairs released a statement on July 12, 2013:

During his visit to Baku on July 17, 2013, Turkish Foreign Affairs Minister Ahmed Davutoglu described Armenian land claims as "product of delirium."

Since 2015

The signing, on 23 December 2015, by Russian defence minister Sergey Shoygu and his Armenian counterpart Seyran Ohanyan of an agreement to form a Joint Air Defense System in the Caucasus that followed the Armenian minister's statement that the ceasefire with Azerbaijan over the breakaway region of Nagorno-Karabakh virtually no longer existed, provoked concern on the part of Turkey's government.

The Armenian Ministry of Foreign Affairs published a statement which condemned the 2019 Turkish offensive into north-eastern Syria, "which would lead to deterioration of regional security, losses among civilians, mass displacement and eventually to a new humanitarian crisis."

2021–2023 normalization process
In December 2021, Armenia and Turkey appointed special envoys to discuss steps for normalization of their relations: former U.S. ambassador Serdar Kılıç is Turkey's representative for Armenia, and vice president of Armenian Parliament Ruben Rubinyan is Armenia's representative for Turkey. They first met in Moscow on 14 January 2022. Their second meeting happened in Vienna on 24 February 2022, Their third meeting was met in Vienna on 3 May 2022, Their fourth meeting was met in Vienna on 1 July 2022, Turkey wants to hold the fifth meeting in Ankara or Yerevan for normalization talks with Armenia. with positive reactions from European Commission spokesman Peter Stano, NATO Secretary General's Special Representative for the Caucasus and Central Asia, Javier Colomina, Turkish pro-government newspapers, and senior fellow of Carnegie Europe Thomas de Waal. Azerbaijani Deputy Minister of Foreign Affairs Khalaf Khalafov also welcomed the start of the normalization process. On 12 March 2022, Turkish Foreign Minister Mevlüt Çavuşoğlu met with his Armenian counterpart Ararat Mirzoyan for "useful and constructive" talks in an effort to restore ties after decades of hostility. The two met at the Antalya Diplomacy Forum. On 11 July 2022, Prime Minister Pashinyan had a telephone conversation with the Turkish President Recep Tayyip Erdogan for the first time.

On 6 October 2022, Armenian prime minister Nikol Pashinyan and Turkish president Recep Tayyip Erdoğan met face-to-face for the first time in Prague during the European Political Community meeting.
In February 2023, Pashinyan called Erdoğan to express condolences regarding the 2023 Turkey–Syria earthquake and said that Armenia is ready to help Turkey. A border crossing was opened to allow the passage of humanitarian aid from Armenia to Turkey. On 15 February 2023 Armenian Foreign Minister Ararat Mirzoyan visited Turkey due to the earthquake disaster and met with his Turkish counterpart Mevlüt Çavuşoğlu in Ankara, Mirzoyan explained to Çavuşoğlu that Armenia was ready to help Turkey.

Outstanding issues

Armenian Genocide denial

Tensions stemming from the Armenian Genocide, the mass murder of around 1 to 1.5 million Armenians by the authorities of the Ottoman Empire during the First World War, are a bitter point of contention, with most historians defining the killings as a genocide, a term whose applicability the Turkish state rejects.

Most historians maintain that it was a deliberate and intentional attempt to exterminate the Armenian population of the Ottoman Empire. This view is also the position of the Republic of Armenia.

The Republic of Turkey rejects the 1.5 million figure for the final death toll, insisting that the deaths were closer to the range of 200,000–300,000, and insists that they were the result of disease, famine and inter-ethnic strife during the turmoil of World War I, saying that the Armenian Dashnak and Henchak rebels had sided with the Russian Army which invaded eastern Anatolia during the war and committed massacres against the local Muslim population (Turks and Kurds) in that area.

Merely to speak of the Armenian genocide in Turkey is to risk "insulting Turkishness", a criminal offense for which various Turkish intelligentsia have been brought to trial, as mentioning the word genocide itself infers its occurrence.

In response to Turkey's calls for a further impartial study, Israel Charny and the International Association of Genocide Scholars responded in an open letter to the Turkish prime minister,

Numerous international organizations have conducted studies of the events, each in turn determining that the term "genocide" aptly describes "the Ottoman massacre of Armenians in 1915–1916." Among the organizations asserting this conclusion are the International Center for Transitional Justice, the International Association of Genocide Scholars, and the United Nations' Sub-Commission on Prevention of Discrimination and Protection of Minorities.

Several nations and U.S. states, have passed formal legislative condemnations of the Armenian Genocide, despite intense Turkish diplomatic and economic pressure. Switzerland has adopted laws that punish genocide denial.

Border dispute

In the post-Soviet climate of irredentism, Turkey was particularly wary of hard-line Armenian sentiment laying claim to the territory of "Historic Armenia" within Turkey. The Armenian Revolutionary Federation, an Armenian political party, continues to insist on a reversion towards the Treaty of Sèvres territorial boundaries. The treaty signed by Ottoman Empire was rejected by Republic of Turkey after it won the Turkish War of Independence and succeeded the empire.

These ongoing border disputes threatened to derail the negotiations between Armenia and Turkey prior to the announcement of the provisional road map in April 2009 with a group of Azerbaijani journalists reportedly refused permission to travel to Turkey to view renovation work on the border gate and Turkish journalist Servet Yanatma and four colleagues later being detained by Armenian authorities after attempting to film the Turkish–Armenian border without permission.

Yanatma, writing in the English-language Today's Zaman, however states that they were treated cordially and released after two hours and quotes an unnamed official as confirming that Armenia would adhere to the 1921 Treaty of Kars and renounce any territorial claims implicit in the national constitution's description of the Turkish territory of Eastern Anatolia as Western Armenia with the statement, "We are talking about the opening of a border. Can a border be opened if it is not recognized?"

It was in response to this issue following the announcement that the Dashnak Party decided to withdraw from the coalition government feeling that renunciation of Armenian territorial claims would be an unacceptably radical change in the country's foreign policy.

Diplomacy

Republic of Armenia
Armenia does not have an embassy in Ankara.

Republic of Turkey
Turkey does not have an embassy in Yerevan.

See also

Anti-Armenian sentiment in Turkey
Accession of Turkey to the European Union
Armenia–Azerbaijan relations
Armenia–European Union relations
Armenia–Turkey border
Turks in Armenia 
Armenians in Turkey  
Foreign relations of Armenia
Foreign relations of Turkey
Azerbaijan–Turkey relations 
Armenia–NATO relations 
European Union–Turkey relations 
Peaceful coexistence
Peaceful Evolution theory
Recognition of the Armenian Genocide 
United States recognition of the Armenian Genocide

References

External links
 Armenian genocide: Why many Turkish people have trouble accepting it, GlobalPost, 2012
 Video – Armenia and Turkey Protocol Signed 
 Has Armenia Set Preconditions for Normalisation?, Mehmet Fatih Öztarsu, Strategic Outlook Institution
 Brief history of Armenian–Turkish relations after the Armenian Genocide.
 Armenian-Turkish Conflict
 Revisiting the Armenian Genocide
 Turkish-Armenian Relations: Roadmap to Peace?
 Turkey-Armenia Relations: Football Diplomacy Starts to Bear Fruits
 'Stop The Protocols' Armenian Website
 Armenian-Turkish dialogue platform
 A new era in Turkish-Armenian relations, Opinion by Bulent Aras, September 2009, European Union Institute for Security Studies
 Armenian Genocide History
 Mustafa Aydin, Armando Garcia Schmidt, Tabib Huseynov, Alexander Iskandaryan, Andrei Zagorski: "After Soccer Diplomacy: The Turkish-Armenian Relations", spotlight Europe 2009/10, October 2009
 Articles about the Armenian-Turkish relations in the Caucasus Analytical Digest No. 11
 Iskandaryan, Alexander: "Armenia–Turkey Relations: Options for 2025" in the Caucasus Analytical Digest No. 19

 
Turkey
Bilateral relations of Turkey